Maybe Happy Ending (lit. "Maybe Happy Ending) is a original South Korean musical with music composed by Will Aronson and lyrics written by Hue Park, and book written by both Aronson and Park. It is their first original musical and second work together after Musical Bungee Jumping.

Directed by Kim Dong-yeon, Maybe Happy Ending opened in Seoul at Lifeway Hall in DCF Daemyung Cultural Factory on December 20, 2016, where it played for 51 performances. 

It was nominated as best musical at The 6th Yegreen Musical Awards, and won four awards including Musical of the Year Award, Music Award (Will Aronson), Directing Award (Kim Dong-yeon)and Female Popularity Award (Jeon Mi-do). It was also nominated for six awards at The 2nd Korean Musical Award and won six awards, including Best Musical, Best Director, Best Music, Lyrics and Book. Local tours and international productions have followed.

Background 
In 2014 Hue Park was sitting in a coffee shop in Brooklyn. He heard the song “Everyday Robots” by Damon Albarn (front man of the rock bands Blur and Gorillaz) was playing. Blur, had been popular in Korea when Park was growing up in the 1990s. Part of the song lyrics caught his attention: ‘We are everyday robots in the process of getting home.’ Park suddenly imagined a world inhabited by 'robots that look just like humans', and that imagination eventually reached a scene where 'robots with human-like appearances and emotions are abandoned and live lonely lives alone'. 

Park had recently ended a long-term relationship, so he thought about closing of a chapter in his life. “I experienced some losses with people around me – parting and death – when I was writing the play,” said Hue. “I realized that love is an act to open your heart even though you expect to feel the pain of loss one day.” Park then sent an email to his friend Will Aronson. Aronson was intrigued about Hue ideas and they eventually started to write the story together.”

The show won six Korean Musical Awards, including Best Director, Best Music, Lyrics and Book. Kim said, "'Maybe Happy Ending' received a lot of love. After (the Musical) receiving the awards as both a writer and a composer, it makes me feel a little reassured to receive the award."

Story

Synopsis 
The background of the work is the not-too-distant future Seoul Metropolitan. Oliver and Claire are helper robots that look completely human-like, created to help people, were abandoned and lives alone and live in an apartment where abandoned helperbots live. Like old-model cellphones with a low version of one in a desk drawer, they end their lifespans away from their owners' attention. Oliver is a helperbot 5 that lacks many functions and has a native design but is durable and sturdy, while Claire is a helperbot 6 that consumes a lot of battery and has a lot of troubles despite its various functions and designs, but with a high battery consumption. Oliver has no sociability, only growing flowers at home and listening to old jazz on LPs.

The futuristic subject of 'the daily life of helper-robots in the 21st century' is contrast with analog sensibility through accoustic jazz melodies. This musical harmonizes delicate scripts, jazz and classical music, warm directing, and solid performances by actors. It makes us look back on the meaning of intimacy and the value of love.

Plot
Plot are told in promotional highlight clips and commentary from the musical. 

First introduction to Oliver, an abandone helperbot type 5, who lived alone. Oliver has been waiting for his previous owner James for over 10 years. He has a monotone daily routine. After charging, he brush his teeth while listening to morning news, does self-repair and waits for postman to deliver his package.

One day Oliver heard someone knocks on his door. Claire actually knocked on the doors of every nearby house to ask for help, but there was no answer, and then finally came to Oliver's house. At first, Oliver also tried to turn her away, but he sees Claire, whose battery had run out, left alone in the hallway. He finally brought her inside. He learn that Claire is a newer model than him, So Oliver need to make somekind of adaptor to be able to charge her.
Claire, who has been charged, starts working. Oliver is dissatisfied that Claire is a helperbot 6, a more advanced model than himself. Oliver childishly mentioned advantaged features of HelperBot 5. Offended, Claire goes back to her house.

Claire tries to fix her own charger, but it only gets worse. Claire call her helperbot friends So-yeon and John for help, but they are busy.
At this time, Claire, seemed to be very concerned about it,so Oliver knocks on the door of Claire's house and leaves the paper cup phone behind. Oliver's suggestion over the paper cup phone was that he would lend her his portable charger if she came at a set time each day, at one o’clock to borrow the charger and return it at 5 o Clock. Claire accepts the offer and goes to Oliver's house twice a day. Meanwhile, while making fun of each other and exchanging simple gifts, Oliver implicitly accepts Claire's knock into his daily life.
One day, Claire does not come as usual. Oliver visits Claire's house. At that time, Claire goes out with her friend, John the helperbot, who already repaired her charger. Oliver, who is trying to get back in hastily, is caught by Claire in the hallway because his ankle part breaks down. When he returns home, Oliver is relieved that he doesn’t have to see her anymore, but somehow he feels strange.

Claire visits Oliver with flowers, and looks around things in Oliver's house. Then, Claire saw a yellow raincoat on a hanger. Claire remembers a robot that picks up bottles in a yellow raincoat, She once saw, and learns that Oliver is collecting and selling bottles to make money. Oliver is saving money for a trip to Jeju Island, to go see James. When Claire asks if James will be surprised if he visits, Oliver says, "Of course he'll be surprised, and he'll be proud of it." 

This scene is Oliver and Claire pretending to be a couple. Going out and pretending to be human.

After listening to Oliver's story, Claire suggests that he don't waste a anymore times saving money and why not go to Jeju Island with her now. Claire also wanted to go to Jeju Island, to see the rare fireflies that remain in the forests of Jeju Island. Claire says that she's renting a car from a friend to drive, so she goes to Jeju Island with Oliver with a portable charger. At first, Oliver, who was reluctant to change his plans, eventually agreed, and the two pack their bags and leave for Jeju Island.

After listening to Oliver's story, Claire suggests that he don't waste a anymore times saving money and why not go to Jeju Island with her now. Claire also wanted to go to Jeju Island, to see the rare fireflies that remain in the forests of Jeju Island. Claire says that she's renting a car from a friend to drive, so she goes to Jeju Island with Oliver with a portable charger. At first, Oliver, who was reluctant to change his plans, eventually agreed, and the two pack their bags and leave for Jeju Island.

Oliver and Claire begin their adventure, driving to Jeju.

Oliver and Claire decided to pretend to be human couple. At first they argue on how They will tell people about where their first met was New York or Paris. However then they have a solid story about their first holding hand, confession, their first kiss etc.

They stop at a motel to recharge. While watching Terminator 2 together, Claire realizes that Oliver has become more precious to her than she thought, and asks Oliver to promise that he will not fall in love with her. After spending one night in a motel, they set off again, and the two finally arrive on Jeju Island. Oliver wanders around and finds James' house. Claire stops Oliver and says, “The reason James hasn't contacted you until now is because he abandoned you.” Angry at Claire's words, Oliver says, “You're jealous of me, who has an owner,” and goes to James's house.

Claire recalls her past. Before being abandoned, Claire was originally a couple's helperbots. At first, the two masters loved each other deeply and affectionately, but their relationship began to grow farther and farther apart, and the woman of the two masters gradually suffered from loneliness. Claire watched the process of breaking the hearts of the owners as they changed, and came to believe that the human heart is not eternal.

Oliver returns. James had already died a year ago, and James's family laughed at the fact that Oliver had visited and said, “The new helperbot at home wouldn't have run away like that.” The thought that the mind is not eternal discourages Oliver. However, when Claire saw that James had left Oliver a record of the piano that he had played himself before he died, Claire realizes that She was wrong, saying, "I've never seen a human who left a gift for a helperbot before he died." He admits that James really regards Oliver as his friend.
Thinking of Claire's comfort and the meaning of James' gift, Oliver accepts that James thought of him to the end but he is no longer in the world, and goes with Claire to the forest of fireflies.

The two return to their apartment in Seoul, leaving behind the beautiful appearance of the fireflies that fill the forest as memories. When Oliver and Claire return to think of each other, they realize that each other's existence has already grown out of control for them, and eventually confess that they have not kept their promise that they will not love each other, and they kiss in the hallway of their apartment. The two become lovers, sharing what they like with their partner, and mimicking human couple fights, and they get along.

However, that was only for a short time, and Claire, who was weak in durability, was becoming more and more irreparably broken, and Oliver, who could endure it for a long time, had no choice but to watch it. At first, Oliver said that it would be okay to join her, but Claire, who couldn't stand Oliver's concern as her body started to deteriorate more and more, suggests that the two should end their relationship.

Even after arranging the relationship, the two feel longing for each other, and eventually decide to erase the memories of the time they spent together. It's sad to erase the memories that were so beautiful and precious, but Oliver and Claire go to their respective houses saying they have no choice but to go through the videos of the two together like a lantern.

After that, Oliver is living every day as before. And Claire knocks on the door again saying her charger is broken. Oliver kindly opens the door this time and lends Claire a charger. While charging with Oliver's charger, Claire asks, "Are you okay?" asked Oliver, "Maybe.", leaving the play open ending.

Casts and characters

Character

Casts of South Korean performances

Productions history

Development 

Park and Aronson started the story planning in February, 2014. They pitched Maybe Happy Ending idea to a producer at the Wooran Cultural Foundation, a nonprofit foundation in Seoul that supports young artists, which has support program called SEEYA STUDIO, SEEYA PLAY, and SEEYA STAGE. It was accepted into support program in the foundation and since fall of 2014, it was able to be developed further. Kim Dong-yeon, who worked together with Park and Aronson in Musical Carmen, joined the project as director. Actress Jeon Mi-do and actor Jeon Uck-jin joined for a reading performance. Maybe Happy Ending premiered at Project Box Seeya in Wooran Cultural Foundation for three-night tryout engagement in September 2015. Tickets were sold out within 3 minutes of opening. 

The show was written in both Korean and English. Both version was performed at a workshop or reading performance in front of Broadway officials in New York in 2016, as the first overseas development supported by the Wooran Cultural Foundation. The English-language version of "Maybe Happy Ending" was awarded the 2017 Richard Rodgers Award by the American Academy of Arts and Letters.

Premiere 
In 2017, Maybe Happy Ending selected for SEEYA STAGE and the performance was held by the Daemyung Cultural Factory. It was premiered at Lifeway Hall in DCF Daemyung Cultural Factory 2nd Building on December 20, 2016 to March 5, 2017, and ran for 51 performances.

The premiere was directed by Kim Dong-yeon, who directed the tryout performance of the work last September. Kim expressed his aspirations, saying,

The music director was Joo Yeon-jo and sound engineer was Kwon Ji-hwi. Stage designer Nam Kyung-sik was collaborating with lighting designer Lee Dong-jin. Makeup design by Kim Min-kyung and costumes was by Doyeon. The original cast featured Jung Moon-sung, Kim Jae-bum, and Jung Uk-jin as Oliver; Jeon Mi-do and Choi Soo-jin as Claire; Ko Hoon-jung and Jong Wan-seong as James. 

Hue, who also works as a freelance designer for an advertising agency in New York, designed the posters for the premiere himself. He recruited photographer Pyo Ji-sik, to capture the lyricism of the work.

The premiere performance had been well received, with all tickets for the preview performance sold out after the opening and recording a 92% occupancy rate. The tickets were sold out 60 of a total of 97 performances, and set an unusual box office record for creative musicals. The Wooran Cultural Foundation, proposed to produce the OST and to donate the OST proceeds to establish a virtuous cycle in the culture and art industry. The production company, Daemyung Cultural Factory, and the creators agreed to the good cause and decided to participate in the donation.

2017 Concert 
The 'Maybe Happy Ending Concert' performed a total of 4 times from June 18th to 20th at Project Box Seeya in Seoul. It was also performed at Playce Camp Jeju Spinning Wolf on the 23rd. Tickets for the Seoul concert. It was organized by actors Jeon Mi-do, Jung Wook-jin, and Ko Hun-jeong, and Korean and American creative teams.

2017 Encore 
One year later, an encore performance was performed at same venue, the Lifeway Hall in DCF Daemyung Cultural Factory 2nd Building from October 23, 2017, to November 12, 2017. In this encore performance, Jeon Mi-do, Go Hoon-jung, and Jeong Wook-jin, who have been together since the tryout performance, as well as Kim Jae-bum, Jung Moon-sung, Choi Su-jin, and Seong Jong-wan, who led the premiere to a box office success, all reprised their roles.

This encore performance also sold out all seats before the opening, and it is expected to continue the popularity of the premiere.

Japan Tour 2017 

The Japanese premiere of Maybe Happy Ending took place on the stage of Sunshine City Theater, Ikebukuro, Tokyo, Japan from May 19 to 28, 2017.  This stage, produced by Synthwave, consists of a new production and cast, and found the Japanese audience with a different charm than the domestic premiere. Synthwave is a global content production company that introduce creative Korean musicals such as On Air, Run to You! and Interview to the Japanese stage.

This performance was produced in a with new direction and stage design, excluding the script and music, to better adapt to the local market. The production team consist of Kim Ji-ho, a young director who led Agatha, Deathtrap, and Old Wicked Song; Park Ji-hoon, who was the music director when the Wooran Foundation developed the work; Choreographer Im Jin-ho and others.

Oliver in this performance were idol-actors, Choi Dong-wook (Seven), Seong-je (Supernova) and former U-Kiss member Kevin (Woo Seong-hyun). Actresses Kim Bo-kyung and Song Sang-eun were double-casts as Claire. Actor Rajun played a one-cast role for multi roles including James.

2018 second season 
Musical Maybe Happy Ending 2018 was performed in Vivaldi Park Hall, Daemyung Cultural Factory Building 1, Seoul from November 13, 2018, to February 10, 2019. Directed by Kim Dong-yeon and Music Director Joo Joo-yeon. In 'Helper Bot 5 Oliver Station', Kim Jae-beom from Season 1 once again stands on stage and perform alternately with three newly cast actors were Moon Tae-yu, Jeon Seong-woo, and Shin Joo-hyeop. Choi Su-jin from premiere show joined by Park Ji-yeon and Kang Hye-in as Claire. Meanwhile, James were triple-casts by Sung Jong-wan, Yang Seung-ri, Kwon Dong-ho.

2018 Japan Tour 
Due to its successful first Japan encore back in 2017, Synthwave produced Japan revival of Musical Maybe Happy Ending. 2018 Japan revival, opened at the main hall of the Yokohama Pacifico Yokohama Conference Center on May 3, 2018 and played there until May 6, 2018. It was followed by performance at the Morinomiya Piroti Hall in Osaka from May 10 to 13, 2018. SE7EN, Supernova Seong-je, and Super Junior Yesung were triple-cast as Oliver. The premiere actors Song Sang-eun back as Claire, joined by Kim Joo-yeon. The cast also included Ra Jun and actor Kim Nam-ho as James.

International production

US production 
In 2020, Maybe Happy Ending makes its English-language debut at Coca-cola Stage the Alliance Theatre in Atlanta from January 18 until February 2020. The production was directed by Broadway power-couple Michael Arden as Director and Andy Mientus as associate director, with Emmy Award-winning Lighting Designer Travis Hagenbuch and Tony Award-winning Costume Designer Clint Ramos. On the creative team were Tony Award-nominated Projections Designer Sven Ortel, Sound Designer Peter Hylenski and Music Director Deborah K. Abramson. The cast included Kenny Tran as Oliver, Cathy Ang as Claire, Dez Duron (TV: The Voice) as Gil Brentley, and John D. Haggerty as James.

Due to the musical featured a largely Asian-American cast, Jesse Green in column Critics Notebook of New York Times praised the show for its casting inclusiveness.

Japanese production 

The first Japanese cast version was performed in Japan following the performance in the United States. Kenji Urai was cast as Oliver. In addition to Urai, Shoko Nakagawa and Kana Hanazawa were double-cast as Claire. Kenji Sakamoto and Shinji Saito also appeared in this work as James. The musical "Maybe Happy Ending" was performed at Theater Creation in Tokyo from August 11 (Tuesday) to August 30 (Sunday), 2020.

Kenji Urai thought about the musical.

Shoko Nakagawa was praise for her innocence and cute performance.

Chinese production 
The Chinese production of musical Maybe Happy Ending was the fourth self-produced musical by SAIC Shanghai Culture Square. Despite the travel inconvenience caused by the pandemic, director Kim Dong-yeon came to Shanghai to join the production. It began its Chinese tour at the Theater Above through Sunday, Shanghai, on July 1st, 2nd and 3rd, 2021. Following the premiere in Shanghai, the musical moves on to Chengdu, Xiamen, Nanjing and Hangzhou in August, Wuxi in September and Tianjin in November.

Directed Dongyuan Jin. Oliver played by Zihongfan Huang, Claire played by Yaorong Guo, and James played by Bin Jiang.

2020 performance (3rd Season) 
In the 2020 season, when CJ E&M (Double K Film & Theater) took charge of the production for the first time and stood at the center of the topic with a solid casting and a new stage. It was performed at Yes 24 Stage 1, Daehangno, from June 30 to September 13, 2020. In the new stage, the band including the piano conductor is placed on the second floor of the stage, and the door that opens and closes in the center of the stage with the introduction of a running set. Changes in the space are freely expressed, a rising floor is added to the stage space used as the main acting space, and the overall use of video has been increased.

Jung Moon-sung from premiere, Jeon Seong-woo, and Yang Hee-jun were cast for the role of Oliver. Jeon Mi-do was also back as Claire, joined by actress Kang Hye-in, and Han Jae-ah. Seong Jong-wan and Lee Seon-geun joined the role of James. In this Season, artificial feeling was added to the acting style and vocal tone of the actors to clarify the identity of the robot character.

2021 performance (4th season)
The production reopened its fourth season at the Yes24 Stage 1, Daehangno, Seoul on June 22, 2021, with Jung Uk-jin from premiere returning in the title role Oliver. Han Jae-ah, who won the Best New Actress Award at the Korea Musical Awards for this work last year, was reprising her role as Claire. Shin Sung-min and Lim Jun-hyeok joined the cast as Oliver, with Hong Ji-hee and Hana also joined as Claire. Seong Jong-wan and Lee Seon-geun play the role of Oliver's former owner, James. The production closed on September 5, 2021, after x performances.

2021 Online performance 
Maybe Happy Ending, reconstructed as an online performance, was released three times in total on Naver TV's 'C-Mu by CJ ENM MUSICAL' channel on the 15th, 22nd and 29th of November 2021. It was filmed and produced for online use with 7 cameras, and various editing techniques were used to capture the actors' delicate facial expressions.

2022 Chinese Performance 
The musical Maybe Happy Ending were staged at the Xishi Grand Theater, Zhejiang, China on May 9, 2022.

Musical numbers 
This Musical’s length is 110 Minutes with no intermission. These are list of songs in the original South Korean version.
 "Why We Loved" (우린 왜 사랑했을까) — James
 "In My Room " (나의 방 안엔) — Oliver
 "It's Not The End" (끝까지 끝은 아니야)— Claire & Company
 "Thank You, Oliver" — Oliver & James
 "Good Luck" (행운을 빌어줘) — Oliver & Claire
 "Goodbye, My Room" — Oliver & Claire
 "Good Luck, Part II" (행운을 빌어줘, Part II) — Oliver & Claire
 "My Favorite Love Story" (낡고 오래된 사랑 노래) — Oliver & Claire
 "Old Love Songs" (낡고 오래된 사랑 노래) — James
 "More Than You Think, More Than You Think" (생각보다, 생각만큼) — Claire
 "Driving" — Oliver & Claire
 "What I Learned from People" (사람들로부터 배운 것) — Claire
 "Why We Loved" (우린 왜 사랑했을까) Piano Solo — James
 "To the Fireflies" (반딧불에게) — Oliver & Claire
 "What Is Love" (사랑이란) — Oliver & Claire
 "My First Time Being in Love" — Oliver & Claire
 "Nevertheless" (그럼에도 불구하고) — Oliver & Claire
 "In My Room & Goodbye My Room" (Reprise) — Oliver & Claire
 "You Can Remember That" (그것만은 기억해도 돼) — Oliver & Claire
 "Why We Loved" (Reprise) (우린 왜 사랑했을까) — James
 Finale — "What is Love, Maybe" — James & Company

US version of the song.
 "World Within My Room" — Oliver
 "The Way That it Has to Be"— Claire & Company
 "Where You Belong"— Oliver & James
 "Goodbye, My Room"— Oliver & Claire
 "Hitting the Road" — Oliver & Claire
"My Favorite Love Story" — Oliver & Claire
 "How To Be Not Alone"— Claire
 "Rearview Mirror"— Oliver & Claire
 "Fireflies in Jeju" (Instrumental)
 "When You're In Love"— Oliver & Claire
 "Touch Sequence" (Instrumental)
 "A Sentimental Reason" — Gil Brentley

Awards and nominations

Note

References

External websites 
Maybe Happy Ending at CJENM
2016 musicals
South Korean musicals